Afamin is a protein that in humans is encoded by the AFM gene.

Function 

This gene is a member of the albumin gene family, which comprises four genes that localize to chromosome 4 in a tandem arrangement. These four genes encode structurally related serum transport proteins that are known to be evolutionarily related. The protein encoded by this gene is regulated developmentally, expressed in the liver and secreted into the bloodstream.

References

External links

Further reading